San Quintín Military Airstrip  is the military airstrip located at Military Camp Number 2-D, located in San Quintín, Municipality of Ensenada, Baja California, Mexico, in the San Quintín Valley. The airport is handled by the Mexican Army and is used solely for military aviation purposes.

External links
SNQ at Flight Stats
SNQ at World Airport Codes

Airports in Baja California